Acacia porcata is a species of wattle found only in one location in Central Queensland.

References

Flora of Queensland
porcata
Taxa named by Paul Irwin Forster